Axel Knoerig (born 1 March 1967) is a German politician of the Christian Democratic Union (CDU) who has been serving as a member of the Bundestag from the state of Lower Saxony since 2009.

Political career 
Knoerig became a member of the Bundestag after the 2009 German federal election, representing the Diepholz – Nienburg I constituency. He served on the Committee on Education, Research and Technology Assessment from 2009 until 2013 before moving to the Committee on Economic Affairs and Energy in 2014.

In addition to his committee assignments, Knoerig is part of the German Parliamentary Friendship Group with the Baltic States (since 2013) and German Parliamentary Friendship Group for Relations with the Southern African States (since 2018).

Political positions 
In June 2017, Knoerig voted against Germany's introduction of same-sex marriage.

References

External links 

  
 Bundestag biography 

1967 births
Living people
Members of the Bundestag for Lower Saxony
Members of the Bundestag 2021–2025
Members of the Bundestag 2017–2021
Members of the Bundestag 2013–2017
Members of the Bundestag 2009–2013
Members of the Bundestag for the Christian Democratic Union of Germany